The 1945 football season was São Paulo's 16th season since the club's founding in 1930.

Overall

{|class="wikitable"
|-
|Games played || 42 (20 Campeonato Paulista, 22 Friendly match)
|-
|Games won || 26 (16 Campeonato Paulista, 10 Friendly match)
|-
|Games drawn || 8 (2 Campeonato Paulista, 6 Friendly match)
|-
|Games lost || 8 (2 Campeonato Paulista, 6 Friendly match)
|-
|Goals scored || 136
|-
|Goals conceded || 62
|-
|Goal difference || +74
|-
|Best result || 12–1 (H) v Jabaquara - Campeonato Paulista - 1945.07.08
|-
|Worst result || 2–6 (A) v Olimpia - Friendly match - 1945.10.12
|-
|Most appearances || 
|-
|Top scorer || 
|-

Friendlies

Official competitions

Campeonato Paulista

Record

External links
official website 

Association football clubs 1945 season
1945
1945 in Brazilian football